The Golden Fox is a FIS Alpine Ski World Cup competition for women, which takes place annually in Slovenia. The competition was founded in 1964 by Dušan Senčar, Marjan Kožuh and Franci Čop.

Since the first edition, most of the races have been held in Maribor at the Pohorje Ski Resort, but since the 2010s, the event has been moved to Kranjska Gora on several occasions due to the lack of snow in Maribor.

History
The first competition was held between 29 February and 1 March 1964, when there were two slalom races. The first race, which was contested by 31 athletes and watched by 5,000 spectators, was won by Marielle Goitschel. Initially, the competition took place on the old FIS course, but in 1978 it was moved to its current location, the Snow Stadium in Maribor.

List of winners 

The Golden Fox trophy is awarded to the skier with the best result in the slalom and giant slalom combined.

Key
SL = Slalom
GS = Giant slalom
— = The event was not scheduled or was interrupted/cancelled due to weather conditions

References

External links 
 

Alpine skiing competitions
Maribor
Alpine skiing in Slovenia
Recurring sporting events established in 1964
1964 establishments in Slovenia